Grace Bible College is a Christian theological seminary in New Lamka in the North-Eastern part of India. The campus sits in a total of three acres of land.

History
Grace Bible College was established on July 4, 1981 with the motto: Teach, Entrust and Witness (2 Tim 2:2).

About Grace Bible College (GBC) 
It is the official Leadership cum Theological and Missiological training institute of the Evangelical Baptist Convention (EBC), a member of the Asia Pacific Baptist Federation (APBF) and the Baptist World Alliance (BWA) which has its headquarters at Dorcas Hall, New Lamka, Churachandpur, Manipur, India.

Programmes Offered
 Dip. Theology (for X Passed)
 Bachelor of Theology (for XII Passed)
 Master of Divinity (for Secular Graduates/B.Th. Passed)
 MTC (for Lay Leaders in Local Dialect)

Affiliation
It is accredited and affiliated by the Asia Theological Association.

Library 
The Library was established in 1981 and is part of the Grace Bible College (GBC) since its inception.  It has a collection of 12,445 Volumes and 10,300 Titles of books.

References

External links
 Official Homepage

Christian seminaries and theological colleges in India
Churachandpur district
1981 establishments in Manipur
Educational institutions established in 1981